Grand Touring Prototype may be:

 GTP, the 1980's sports prototype class under IMSA GT Championship
 GTP, the 2020's sports prototype (ie. LMDh) class under IMSA SportsCar Championship

See also
 Le Mans Prototype, GTP-style cars
 Daytona Prototype, 2010's GTP replacements
 Group C, 1980's FIA equivalents to the IMSA ones